Jamal Yusupov is a Russian-Turkish kickboxer and Muay Thai fighter. He is currently competing in ONE Championship. As of March 6, 2023, he is #4 ranked in the ONE Featherweight Muay Thai rankings.

Biography and career

Early life
Yusupov started training in Muay Thai at the age of 21 and turned to competition only a few months later. He became a Master of Sports in Muay Thai in 2005 and a Master of Sports in kickboxing the next year. Yusupov competed in Russia where he became a six time national amateur Muay Thai champion. He began coaching in 2011 and later moved to Beijing, China.

ONE Championship
On October 23, 2019, Yusupov replaced Sasha Moisa on short notice at ONE Championship: Age Of Dragons for a fight against Yodsanklai Fairtex. In an upset, he won by second-round knockout with punches. This marked Yodsanklai's first knockout loss since 2005.

Yusupov was scheduled to face Samy Sana at ONE Championship: Collision Course 2 on 25 December 2020. He won by unanimous decision after scoring a knock down in the second round.

In 2022 Yusupov relocated to Turkey. He faced Jo Nattawut under Muay Thai rules at ONE 159 on July 22, 2022. Yusupov won the fight by unanimous decision after scoring a knockdown.

Yusupov challenged Tawanchai P.K. Saenchaimuaythaigym for the ONE Featherweight Muay Thai World Championship on February 25, 2023, at ONE Fight Night 7. He lost the bout via a leg kick knockout just 49 seconds into the bout.

Titles and accomplishments
Amateur
6x Russia National Muay Thai Champion

Fight record 

|-  style="background:#fbb;"
| 2023-02-25 || Loss||align=left| Tawanchai P.K. Saenchaimuaythaigym || ONE Fight Night 7 || Bangkok, Thailand || KO (Leg Kick) || 1 || 0:49 
|-
! style=background:white colspan=9 |

|-  style="background:#cfc;"
| 2022-07-22 ||Win ||align=left| Jo Nattawut || ONE 159 || Kallang, Singapore || Decision (Unanimous)  ||3  ||3:00

|-  style="text-align:center; background:#cfc;"
| 2022-03-26 || Win ||align=left| Bobirjon Tagaev || Vendetta 25 || Istanbul, Turkey  || Decision (Unanimous) || 3 || 3:00 

|-  align="center" style="background:#cfc;"
| 2020-12-25 || Win ||align=left| Samy Sana || ONE Championship: Collision Course 2  || Kallang, Singapore || Decision (Unanimous) || 3 || 3:00

|-  style="text-align:center; background:#cfc;"
|  2019-11-16 || Win || align="left" | Yodsanklai Fairtex ||  ONE Championship: Age Of Dragons || Beijing, China || KO (Punches) || 2 || 0:35
|-
|-  style="text-align:center; background:#cfc;"
|  2019-10-02 || Win || align="left" | Liao Shiwu ||  Kunlun Fight 85 || Tongliao, China || KO (punch to the body) || 1 ||  2:09

|-  style="text-align:center; background:#cfc;"
|  2019-08-24 || Win || align="left" | Bo Fufan ||  Wu Lin Feng 2019: WLF World Cup 2019-2020 || Zhengzhou, China || Decision (Unanimous) || 3 || 3:00 

|-  style="text-align:center; background:#cfc;"
| 2018-06-16 || Win ||align=left| Xu Zhenhuang || Wu Lin Feng 2018: China vs Netherlands & Russia || Shenyang, China || KO (Left body kick)|| 1 || 1:02

|-  style="text-align:center; background:#cfc;"
| 2018-05-19 || Win ||align=left| Sun Weiqiang || Wu Lin Feng 2018: World Championship Yichun || Yichun, Jiangxi, China || Decision (Unanimous)|| 3 || 3:00

|-  style="text-align:center; background:#fbb;"
| 2018-03-10 || Loss||align=left| Marouan Toutouh || Wu Lin Feng 2018: -60kg World Championship Tournament || Jiaozuo, China || Decision || 3 || 3:00

|-  style="text-align:center; background:#fbb;"
| 2018-03-03|| Loss ||align=left| Regian Eersel || Wu Lin Feng 2018: World Championship Tianjin || Tianjin, China || Decision (Unanimous) || 3 || 3:00

|-  style="text-align:center; background:#cfc;"
|  2017- || Win || align="left" | Huang Zhenyou  ||  Wu Lin Feng ||  China || KO (Knee to the body)|| 1 || 
|-

|-  style="text-align:center; background:#cfc;"
|  2017- || Win || align="left" | Zheng Zhaoyu  ||  Wu Lin Feng ||  China || KO ||  || 
|-

|-  style="text-align:center; background:#cfc;"
|  2016-10-22 || Win || align="left" | Said || World Fighters King  ||  China || ||  || 

|- align="center" bgcolor="#fbb"
| 2014-12-19 || Loss ||align=left| Alim Nabiev || Tvoy Vykhod || Lyubertsy, Russia || Decision || 3 || 3:00 

|- align="center" bgcolor="#cfc"
| 2013-12-20|| Win ||align=left| Sanjar Yusupov || Night of Muaythai||  Moscow, Russia || Decision (Unanimous) || 5 || 3:00 

|- align="center" bgcolor="#fbb"
| 2012-10-20|| Loss ||align=left| Alexander Surzhko || Combat Line 15th anniversary||  Russia || KO (Left hook)|| 3 ||  

|- align="center" bgcolor="#fbb"
| 2011-11-04|| Loss ||align=left| Andrey Prepelkin || Fights in Corona|| Moscow, Russia || KO (Spinning back fist)|| 1 ||  
|-
| colspan=9 | Legend:

See also 
List of male kickboxers

References

1983 births
Living people
Russian male kickboxers
Russian Muay Thai practitioners
ONE Championship kickboxers
Sportspeople from Dagestan